Provincial Road 222 (PR 222) is a provincial road in Manitoba, Canada. Essentially a northerly continuation of Highway 9, the road extends for 42.6 kilometres between the communities of Gimli and Riverton along the western shore of Lake Winnipeg.

The road is the inspiration for and namesake of singer-songwriter John K. Samson's 2010 EP Provincial Road 222, which consists of three songs set in geographic locations along the route.

References

External links
Route of PR 222 on Google Maps

222